Leandro Díaz may refer to:

 Leandro Díaz (composer) (1928–2013), Colombian vallenato music composer
 Leandro Díaz (footballer, born 1986), Argentine footballer
 Leandro Díaz (footballer, born 1990), Uruguayan footballer
 Leandro Díaz (footballer, born 1992), Argentine footballer
 Leandro Díaz (footballer, born 1999), Chilean footballer
 Leandro Díaz (TV series), a Colombian television series on the life of composer Leandro Díaz.